The women's omnium competition at the 2023 UEC European Track Championships was held on 10 February 2023.

Results

Scratch race

Tempo race

Elimination race

Points race

References

Women's omnium
European Track Championships – Women's omnium